The Badidae (the chameleonfishes) are a small family (about 30 species) which has been placed in the order Anabantiformes. However, the 5th edition of Fishes of the World classifies the family as being a sister to the Anabantiformes, along with the Nandidae and Pristolepididae in an unnamed and unranked but monophyletic clade which is a sister to the Ovalentaria within the wider Percomorpha. Members of this family are small freshwater fish that are found in Bangladesh, Bhutan, China, India, Laos, Myanmar, Nepal, Pakistan and Thailand.

References

 
Ray-finned fish families